The Monument to Nizami Ganjavi, a medieval Persian poet, is located in Tashkent, the capital of Uzbekistan, in a square near the Tashkent State Pedagogic University named after Nizami, near a park named after Babur. Ilham Jabbarov is the sculptor of the monument.

History
The monument was installed on March 23, 2004. Ilham Aliyev, the President of Azerbaijan and Islam Karimov, the President of Uzbekistan took part at the opening ceremony of the monument.

Description of the monument
The monument consists of a granite bust of Nizami Ganjavi, portraying the poet in the eastern attire with a turban on his head and holding a book in his left hand and with the right hand on his chest. The name of the poet, the dates of his birth and death are written on the pedestal in Uzbek and Azerbaijani languages.

See also 
 Campaign on granting Nizami the status of the national poet of Azerbaijan

References

External links
 Памятник Низами
 Памятник Низами
 В Ташкенте будет воздвигнут памятник азербайджанскому поэту Низами

Buildings and structures completed in 2004
Monuments and memorials in Uzbekistan
Tashkent
Tourist attractions in Tashkent
Buildings and structures in Tashkent